Bulavin is a Russian male surname, its feminine counterpart is Bulavina. It may refer to
Sergei Bulavin (born 1973), Russian association football player
Vyacheslav Bulavin (born 1946), Russian association football coach and former player
Vladimir Bulavin (born 1953), Russian official senior executive officer

See also
Bulavin Rebellion